The Sarasota Open is a professional tennis tournament played on outdoor green clay courts. It is currently part of the Association of Tennis Professionals (ATP) Challenger Tour. From 2022, the event is held at the Payne Park Tennis Center in Sarasota, Florida, United States. It has been held at the United Tennis Center in Bradenton, Florida in its inaugural event (named Hurricane Open) in 2008 and in 2017. Other locations were Lakewood Ranch (2015–2016) and Longboat Key (2009–2014). An expected move to Bath and Racquet Athletic Club near Bee Ridge and U.S. 41 fell through as the tournament was moved to United Tennis Center in 2017. After 2 years off due to the COVID-19 and owners changing, the Sarasota Open announced a comeback in 2022. Under new management, the tournament made another move from their previous location at Laurel Oak Country Club (2018–2019) to Payne Park.

Past finals

Singles

Doubles

External links
Official website

 
ATP Challenger Tour
Clay court tennis tournaments
Tennis tournaments in the United States
Recurring sporting events established in 2008